Manoel de Oliveira Lima (Recife, state of Pernambuco, Brazil, December 25, 1867 – Washington, D.C., March 24, 1928) was a Brazilian writer, literary critic, diplomat, historian, and journalist.

He represented Brazil in several countries and was a visiting professor at Harvard University. He was a founding member of the Brazilian Academy of Letters.

Passionate about books, he collected them throughout his life and assembled the third largest collection on Brazil, losing only to the National Library of Brazil and to the library of the University of São Paulo. The Oliveira Lima Library, located at the Catholic University of America, Washington, USA, has 58,000 books in addition to correspondence exchanged with intellectuals, more than six hundred paintings and countless albums of clippings with newspaper news. It is part of the collection also one of the three busts of Dom Pedro I sculpted by Marc Ferrez (uncle of the eponymous photographer), the only one of the three made in bronze.

References 

Brazilian writers

1867 births
1928 deaths